The 2004 Melbourne Storm season was the 7th in the club's history. They competed in the NRL's 2004 Telstra Premiership and finished the regular season 6th out of 15 teams.

Inconsistency plagued Storm in Craig Bellamy’s second season in charge, but the team won four games in a row during the middle part of the year to move into the top four. They could not maintain their run though, eventually finishing sixth. Once again Storm won its first final, a 31-14 triumph over the Broncos at Suncorp Stadium before bowing out to the Bulldogs for the second straight season the following week. John Ribot departed the club early in the 2004 season with Frank Stanton stepping in as acting CEO for the next 12 months.

Season Summary
 World Sevens – Storm avenge their 2003 loss to Lebanon in the Rugby League World Sevens, but fail to progress out of Pool C.
 4 March – In the wake of the Coffs Harbour scandal overshadowing the start of the 2004 NRL season, reports emerge two Melbourne players are being accused of sexual assault, claims which are later ruled unfounded.
 7 March – With a forthcoming bye in Round 1, Melbourne play foundation NSWRL club Newtown Jets in an extra trial match at Henson Park.
 12 March – Club founder John Ribot resigns as executive director of the club. Ribot later sells his remaining shares in the club to News Limited. Ribot and News are forced to deny the decision was connected to Ribot's handling of allegations against two Melbourne players. Frank Stanton is appointed interim CEO of the club.
 17 March – Coach Craig Bellamy agrees to a new contract to coach Melbourne until the end of 2007.
 Round 2 – Despite leading 14-10 at half time, Melbourne lose their first game for the season at home to Newcastle Knights.
 28 April – Melbourne is found by the NRL to have exceeded the competition's salary cap in 2003 and are fined $130,956.
 Round 6 – Celebrating his 200th NRL game, Danny Williams scores two tries and adds a late conversion to bring up a 50-4 win over South Sydney Rabbitohs.
 Round 8 – Referee Tony Archer awards New Zealand Warriors goalkicker Sione Faumuina a second shot at goal after Melbourne captain Stephen Kearney deliberately threw a water bottle in his line of vision. The Warriors regain the Michael Moore Trophy with a 20-14 win in Auckland.
 13 May – Outspoken Parramatta Eels CEO Denis Fitzgerald declares that Melbourne Storm be disbanded and forced to relocate to the Gold Coast, saying "promoting rugby league in Melbourne is akin to promoting beach volleyball in Iceland."
 Round 12 – Melbourne win their first ever game at EnergyAustralia Stadium, beating the Newcastle Knights 28-16. The club had previously lost six straight games at the venue.
 Round 14 – Despite reaching a 16-0 lead, Melbourne lose 28-26 to South Sydney Rabbitohs in Souths' caretaker coach Arthur Kitanis first game in charge.
 Round 16 – In a night of milestones with the club celebrating Robbie Kearns (250 games), Matt Geyer (150 games, 144 games for Melbourne to equal Marcus Bai's record); Storm thrash Warriors 42-6 to take back the Michael Moore Trophy.
 Round 17 – Melbourne blitz Penrith Panthers 66-14, setting new club records for the highest score and record winning margin at Olympic Park.  Matt Orford scored a new club record 11 goals from 12 attempts.
 14 July – Club captain Stephen Kearney announces he will be leaving Melbourne at the end of the season to finish his career with Super League club Hull F.C.
 Round 19 – Danny Williams is sent off for king-hitting Wests Tigers forward Mark O'Neill. O'Neill is cited and later found guilty of a careless high tackle on Williams, but receives no suspension. After the NRL judiciary hearing is adjourned for two weeks after evidence is introduced claiming Williams was suffering "post-traumatic amnesia", he receives a 18-match suspension, the longest suspension handed down in over a decade.
 Round 20 – Scoring 18 points (3 tries, 3 goals) himself, a controversial last second Matt Orford try hands Melbourne a 22-16 win against Parramatta. Eels coach Brian Smith furious with video referee Chris Ward to award the Orford try, calling the decision "disgusting".
 Round 23 – Jeremy Smith makes his NRL debut, scoring a try with his first touch of the ball. Smith is the first former Melbourne Storm junior to play with the club.
 Round 24 – In their last game at Olympic Park, Rodney Howe and Stephen Kearney lead Melbourne to a 22-12 victory over Canterbury-Bankstown Bulldogs, the club's first win against that club since 2000.
 September 13 – News Limited appoint former St Kilda CEO Brian Waldron as the club's new CEO.
 Round 26 – Secure in sixth position on the NRL ladder, Craig Bellamy rests a number of players from the club's final regular season game against Manly. Melbourne lose 30-28 with Bellamy expressing his anger at match referee Steve Lyons and video referee Paul Simpkins over a number of contentious decisions.
 September 7 – With 23 points, Matt Orford finishes in a tied for third in the 2004 Dally M Medal count, four points behind winner Danny Buderus.
 Qualifying Final – Down 8-0 at half time, Melbourne stun the Brisbane Broncos in a pulsating second half, winning 31-14 at Suncorp Stadium. Matt Orford also kicks the first field goal for Melbourne in over five years.
 Semi Final – For the second straight season, Melbourne are eliminated from the NRL finals by the Bulldogs, this time going down 43-18 at Aussie Stadium. Down 16-0 early, Melbourne were never really in the match, in what was former captain Rodney Howe's last game of rugby league.

Milestone games

Jerseys

Melbourne's jerseys were unchanged from the designs implemented by Canterbury of New Zealand in 2003. The club's clash colours were again a mostly white design with a purple chevron and gold thunderbolts, worn with navy shorts. Honda finished up as sponsor at the end of 2003, and there was no sleeve sponsor for 2004.

Fixtures

Pre Season

Regular season
Source:
(GP) - Golden Point extra time
(pen) - Penalty try

Finals

Ladder

2004 Coaching Staff
Head coach: Craig Bellamy
Assistant coaches: Dean Lance & Peter Sharp

Football Manager: Greg Brentnall
Physical Preparation Coach: Alex Corvo
Physiotherapist: Matt Natusch
Head Trainer: Troy Thompson

2004 squad
List current as of 20 September 2021

Player movements

Losses
 Marcus Bai to Leeds Rhinos
 Junior Langi to Parramatta Eels
 Aaron Moule to Widnes Vikings
 Mitchell Sargent to North Queensland Cowboys
 Nathan Sologinkin to Released
 Semi Tadulala to Wakefield Trinity Wildcats

Gains
 Alex Chan from Parramatta Eels
 Ben MacDougall from Manly Warringah Sea Eagles
 Steve Turner from Penrith Panthers

Representative honours
This table lists all players who have played a representative match in 2004.

Statistics
This table contains playing statistics for all Melbourne Storm players to have played in the 2004 NRL season.

Statistics sources:

Scorers

Most points in a game: 22 points
 Round 17 - Matt Orford (11 goals) vs Penrith Panthers

Most tries in a game: 3 
 Round 6 - Jake Webster vs South Sydney Rabbitohs
 Round 12 - Matt Geyer vs Newcastle Knights
 Round 17 - Steve Turner vs Penrith Panthers
 Round 20 - Matt Orford vs Parramatta Eels
 Round 23 - Matt King vs New Zealand Warriors

Winning games

Highest score in a winning game: 66 points 
 Round 17 vs Penrith Panthers

Lowest score in a winning game: 22 points
 Round 11 vs Canberra Raiders
 Round 20 vs Parramatta Eels

Greatest winning margin: 52 points 
 Round 17 vs Penrith Panthers

Greatest number of games won consecutively: 4
 Round 10 - Round 13

Losing games

Highest score in a losing game: 28 points
 Round 26 vs Manly Warringah Sea Eagles

Lowest score in a losing game: 10 points 
 Round 21 vs Sydney Roosters

Greatest losing margin: 25 points
 Semi Final vs Canterbury-Bankstown Bulldogs

Greatest number of games lost consecutively: 2 
 Round 4 - Round 5
 Round 8 - Round 9
 Round 18 - Round 19
 Round 21 - Round 22

Feeder Team
Melbourne Storm reserve players again travelled to Brisbane each week to play with Queensland Cup team Norths Devils. Coached for a second season by Gary Greinke, Norths returned to the finals, finishing second in the regular season behind eventual premiers Burleigh Bears. However, the Devils were bundled out of the finals in straight sets. Melbourne Storm rookie Jeremy Smith won the Devils Player of the Year Award.

During the season, Greg Inglis made his first grade debut as a 17-year-old, scoring two tries. Inglis would play six Queensland Cup games for the season, scoring eight tries, also representing Queensland in underage representative games.

Awards and honours

Melbourne Storm Awards Night
 Melbourne Storm Player of the Year: Matt Orford 
 Greg Brentnall Trophy (Coterie Award): Matt Orford
 Rookie of the Year: Matt King  
 Clubman of the Year: Rodney Howe  
 Mick Moore Chairman's Award: Stephen Kearney

Dally M Awards Night
Peter Frilingos Memorial Award: Billy Slater

Notes

References

Melbourne Storm seasons
Melbourne Storm season